Jeffrey John Kripal (born 1962) is an American college professor. He is the  J. Newton Rayzor Chair in Philosophy and Religious Thought at Rice University in Houston, Texas.

His work includes the study of comparative erotics and ethics in mystical literature, American countercultural translations of Asian religions, and the history of Western esotericism from gnosticism to New Age religions.

Scholarly Impact

Kali's Child
Kripal's 1995 book Kali's Child: The Mystical and the Erotic in the Life and Teachings of Ramakrishna was a study of the Bengali mystic Ramakrishna. The book was a psychoanalytic study arguing that Ramakrishna's mystical experiences involved a strong homoerotic dimension. The book won the American Academy of Religion's History of Religions Prize for the Best First Book of 1995. A second, revised edition was published in 1998.  The book has been dogged by controversy ever since its initial publication in 1995. The book's claims have been questioned by the scholars and Alan Roland, and members of the Ramakrishna Mission (Swami Tyagananda and Pravrajika Vrajaprana), often on the grounds of translation errors. However, Bengal scholar Brian Hatcher has defended Kripal's translations.

Esalen: America and the Religion of No Religion
In 2007 The University of Chicago Press released Esalen: America and the Religion of No Religion, Kripal's account of the Esalen Institute, the retreat center and think-tank located in Big Sur, California.  Writing in the Journal of American History, Catherine Albanese called it "a highly personal account that is also a superb historiographical exercise and a masterful work of analytical cultural criticism."

Authors of the Impossible
Kripal's 2011 book traces the history of psychic phenomena over the last two centuries. The book profiles four writers: the British psychical researcher F. W. H. Myers, the American anomalist writer and humorist Charles Fort, the astronomer, computer scientist, and ufologist Jacques Vallee, and the French philosopher Bertrand Méheust.

Chronicle of Higher Education
In a March 2014 article for the Chronicle of Higher Education, "Visions of the Impossible", Kripal cited Mark Twain, who wrote that a dream about his brother's death appeared to come true in detail a few weeks later. Kripal writes that

The professional debunker's insistence, then, that the phenomena play by his rules and appear for all to see in a safe and sterile laboratory is little more than a mark of his own ignorance of the nature of the phenomena in question.

Kripal's article was criticized by Jerry Coyne in The New Republic as "the latest anti-science argument."

Criticism 
Businessman Rajiv Malhotra has questioned the view and approach Kripal takes in Kali's Child, alongside the approach taken by many other scholars of India. In his book Invading the Sacred: An Analysis of Hinduism Studies in America, Malhotra's criticisms are primarily based on the work of Swami Tyagananda.

As a result of criticisms like Malhotra's, Kripal was among a group of scholars receiving death threats and physical attacks from Hindus offended by his portrayals. He shifted his research focus away from Hinduism afterward, claiming, “I stuck with it and responded as best as I could for about six or seven years. It just wore me down after a while. At some point I felt like it wasn’t worth it anymore, that it was starting to affect my health. I couldn’t go anywhere, any conference or anything, without having to deal with the thought police, as it were.”

Bibliography

Books authored
Kali's Child: The Mystical and the Erotic in the Life and Teachings of Ramakrishna (Chicago, 1995, 1998) 
Roads of Excess, Palaces of Wisdom: Eroticism and Reflexivity in the Study of Mysticism (Chicago, 2001) 
 The Serpent's Gift: Gnostic Reflections on the Study of Religion (University of Chicago Press, 2006) 
Esalen: America and the Religion of No Religion (Chicago, 2007) 
 Authors of the Impossible: The Paranormal and the Sacred (University of Chicago Press, 2010) 
 Mutants and Mystics: Science Fiction, Superhero Comics, and the Paranormal (Chicago: University of Chicago Press, 2011) 
 Super Natural: A New Vision of the Unexplained, and Whitley Strieber (New York: Tarcher, Penguin, 2016) 
 Secret Body: Erotic and Esoteric Currents in the History of Religions (Chicago: University of Chicago Press, 2017) 
 The Flip: Epiphanies of Mind and the Future of Knowledge (New York: Bellevue Literary Press, 2019) 
 The Superhumanities: Historical Precedents, Moral Objections, New Realities (Chicago: University of Chicago Press, 2022)

Books edited
Vishnu on Freud's Desk: A Reader in Psychoanalysis and Hinduism edited with T.G. Vaidyanathan (Oxford, 1999) 
Crossing Boundaries: Essays on the Ethical Status of Mysticism edited with G. William Barnard (Seven Bridges, 2002) 
Encountering Kali: In the Margins, at the Center, in the West edited with Rachel Fell McDermott (California, 2003) 
On the Edge of the Future: Esalen and the Evolution of American Culture edited with Glenn Shuck (Indiana, 2005) 
Hidden Intercourse: Eros and Sexuality in the History of Western Esotericism edited with Wouter J. Hanegraaff (New York, 2010)

Articles and essays
 Mystical Homoeroticism, Reductionism, and the Reality of Censorship: A Response to Gerald James Larson. Journal of the American Academy of Religion, volume 66, number 3, pages 627–635 (1998).
 Textuality, Sexuality, and the Future of the Past: A Response to Swami Tyagananda. Evam: Forum on Indian Representations, volume 1, issues 1–2, pages 191–205 (2002).
 Foreword to Adi Da's The Knee of Listening (2003)
 Comparative Mystics: Scholars as Gnostic Diplomats. Common Knowledge, volume 3 issue 10, pages 485–517 (2004)
 "Sexuality (Overview)". The Encyclopedia of Religion, 2nd edition (2005)
 "Phallus and Vagina"." In Encyclopedia of Religion (2005)
 Reality Against Society: William Blake, Antinomianism, and the American Counter Culture. Common Knowledge, volume 13, issue 1 (Winter 2007)
 Re-membering Ourselves: Some Countercultural Echoes of Contemporary Tantric Studies, lead-essay of inaugural issue, Journal of South Asian Religion, volume 1 issue 1 (2007)
 "Liminal Pedagogy: The Liberal Arts and the Transforming Ritual of Religious Studies." in How Should We Talk About Religion? Perspectives, Contexts, Particularities, edited by J. White (University of Notre Dame Press, 2006)
 "Western Popular Culture, Hindu Influences On."  In The Encyclopedia of Hinduism edited by D. Cush, C. Robinson, and M. York, Routledge/Curzon (2007)
 The Rise of the Imaginal: Psychical Phenomena on the Horizon of Theory (Again)." Religious Studies Review volume 33 issue 3 (2007)
 "Myth" in The Blackwell Companion to the Study of Religion edited by R. Segal. Wiley-VCH (2008)

 See also 
 Invading the SacredReferences

External links
Kripal's blog on Reality Sandwich 
An excerpt from Esalen: America and the Religion of No Religion. 
AUTHORS OF THE IMPOSSIBLE A documentary based on the book by Jeffrey J. Kripal. 
kripal.rice.edu  Dr. Kripal's Rice University web page. 
Kali's Child Discussion Site An article by Dr. Kripal regarding the Kali's Child controversy.

Living people
American religion academics
American Indologists
Researchers of new religious movements and cults
Rice University faculty
University of Chicago Divinity School alumni
1962 births
Western esotericism scholars